Pierluigi Cimma or Pier Luigi Cimma (19 August 1941 – 31 July 2006) was an Italian composer, lutenist, guitarist and teacher.

Cimma was born in Turin. He was the longtime chairman of the guitar department at the Conservatorio Statale di Musica Giuseppe Verdi, and the founder of the Bardonecchia Guitar Festival. His works had been published by Edizioni Berben.

He was a student of Andrés Segovia. His own students included Gabriella Perugini, Roman Turovsky, Massimo Moscardo, Salvatore Gullace, Fabio Rizza and Massimo Riva

References

1941 births
2006 deaths
Italian composers
Italian male composers
Italian guitarists
Italian male guitarists
Italian lutenists
Italian music educators
Musicians from Turin
20th-century Italian musicians
20th-century guitarists
20th-century Italian male musicians